Eg is a town of almost 2,500 residents in Bamyan Province, Afghanistan.  It is located at 34.0667 N latitude, 67.1167 longitude at an altitude of approximately 2800 meters (9200 feet), near the towns of Pshin Mazar, Zergak and Zerko.

Climate
The town has a subarctic climate (Köppen: Dsc) with mild, dry summers and cold, long winters.

See also
Bamyan Province

Populated places in Bamyan Province